The West Indian cricket team toured India and Ceylon in December 1966 and January 1967 to play a three-match Test series against the Indian national cricket team. West Indies won the Test series 2–0. India were captained by Mansoor Ali Khan Pataudi and West Indies by Garfield Sobers. In January, the West Indians played a first-class rated international against the Ceylon national cricket team at the Paikiasothy Saravanamuttu Stadium, Colombo. The match was drawn. Ceylon were captained by Michael Tissera.

Test series summary

First Test

Second Test

Third Test

References

External links
 West Indies to India 1966-67 at Test Cricket Tours
 West Indies in India and Ceylon 1966-67 at CricketArchive

Further reading
 Dicky Rutnagur, "West Indies triumph but cracks begin to show", The Cricketer, Spring Annual, 1967, pp. 65–68
 Dicky Rutnagur, "West Indies in India, 1966-67", Wisden 1968, pp. 855–70

1966 in Indian cricket
1966 in West Indian cricket
1967 in Indian cricket
1967 in West Indian cricket
1967 in Ceylon
Indian cricket seasons from 1945–46 to 1969–70
International cricket competitions from 1960–61 to 1970
Sri Lankan cricket seasons from 1880–81 to 1971–72
1966-67
1967